Cryptocranium laterale is a species of beetle in the family Cerambycidae. It was described by Audinet-Serville in 1835. It is known from Bolivia and Brazil.

References

Pteropliini
Beetles described in 1835